Amelia County High School (ACHS), part of the Amelia County Public Schools system, is a public high school located in Amelia Courthouse, Virginia, United States. ACHS serves over 500 students grades 9–12 to citizens within Amelia County.

History 
In the 1960s, the school was formed with the combination of the all white Amelia High School and the all African American Russell Grove High School to make the new Amelia County High School. In addition to a new name, there was a new school song, new colors - green and gold - and a new mascot, The Raider.

Academics 
ACHS ranks among the top 8,200 high schools in America, 180th in Virginia, and 23rd in the Richmond Mero Area. 17% of students take part in Advanced Placement classes. The graduation rate is 98%.

Athletics 
With an enrollment of roughly 578 as of 2016–2017, Amelia County High School plays in Group A of the Virginia High School League. The mascot for this high school is a raider and the school colors are green and gold. The raider is a medieval soldier, wearing armor and carrying a shield and javelin while riding a horse.  The school is part of the James River District in Southside Virginia.

Accountability 
Amelia County High School is fully accredited. This means that school meets "the commonwealth's expectations for student learning in English, mathematics, and history/social science."  A school can earn this accreditation based on its students test results and graduation rates.

Notable alumni
 Monte Kennedy, former MLB player (New York Giants)

References

Public high schools in Virginia
Schools in Amelia County, Virginia
1969 establishments in Virginia